A School for Husbands is a lost 1917 American comedy silent film directed by George Melford, written by Hugh Stanislaus Stange and Harvey F. Thew, and starring Fannie Ward, Jack Dean, Edythe Chapman, Frank Elliott, Mabel Van Buren and James Neill. It was released on April 5, 1917, by Paramount Pictures.

Plot
A woman named Betty (Fannie Ward) is simple and plain; her husband finds that boring and doesn't invite her out. She decides she needs to wear nicer clothes to get the attention of her husband. Suddenly she inherits a large amount of money while at the same time her husband loses all his money in a stock market crash. Her husband doesn't realize she is rich so he goes out to California to sell some of their property to raise some final money. She takes a car out to find him but she is accompanied by another man. When her husband sees this he fights with the man, and Betty's husband mistakenly thinks he kills the other man. When the police and the man who was really killed show up at the same time, Betty's husband realizes he has been acting foolishly. Betty decides to forgive him and they decide to try to give their marriage another fresh try.

Cast 
Fannie Ward as Lady Betty Manners
Jack Dean as John Manners
Edythe Chapman as Mrs. Manners
Frank Elliott as Sir Harry Lovell
Mabel Van Buren as	Mrs. Airlie
James Neill as Auto Salesman
Frank Borzage as Hugh Aslam
Irene Aldwyn as Claire Manners

References

External links 
 
 

1917 films
1910s English-language films
Silent American comedy films
1917 comedy films
Paramount Pictures films
Films directed by George Melford
American black-and-white films
Lost American films
American silent feature films
1917 lost films
Lost comedy films
1910s American films
English-language comedy films